The Women's long jump event  at the 2009 European Athletics Indoor Championships was held on March 6–7.

Medalists

Results

Qualification
Qualifying performance: 6.55 (Q) or 8 best performers (q) advanced to the Final.

Final

References
Results

Long jump at the European Athletics Indoor Championships
2009 European Athletics Indoor Championships
2009 in women's athletics